The Gujarat state of western India has four National Parks and twenty-three wildlife sanctuaries which are managed by the Forest Department of the Government of Gujarat.

National Parks

Wildlife sanctuaries
The wildlife sanctuaries are listed in descending order of area.

Other protected areas

See also 
 Arid Forest Research Institute  cater the forestry research needs of the Arid and semi arid region of Rajasthan, Gujarat & Dadra and Nagar Haveli & Daman-Diu.

References

National parks
N
Gujarat
Gujarat
Environment of Gujarat